Ireland toured North America in May 2009, playing a Test match against Canada and the United States. Ireland won both matches, despite most of their first string players away on the 2009 Lions tour to South Africa.

Matches

Touring party 
Ireland named their 25-man tour squad on 17 May 2009, which included 13 previously uncapped players.

 Manager: Declan Kidney
 Captain: Rory Best

See also
History of rugby union matches between Ireland and United States
2009 mid year rugby union tests

References

2009
2009 in American rugby union
2009 in Canadian rugby union
tour
2009 rugby union tours